Piatti may refer to:

People
 Carlo Alfredo Piatti (1822–1901), Italian cellist
 Giovanni Battista Piatti (1812–1867), Italian civil engineer
 Ignacio Piatti (born 1985), Argentine footballer
 Marco Piatti (born 1958), Swiss gymnast
 Pablo Piatti (born 1989), Argentine footballer
 Polo Piatti, British-Argentine composer, pianist and conductor
 Prospero Piatti (c. 1842–1902), Italian painter
 Lorna Piatti-Farnell (born 1980), New Zealand academic
 Riccardo Piatti (born 1958), Italian tennis coach
 Sante Piatti (1687–1747), Italian painter
 Ugo Piatti (1888–1953), Italian painter and instrument maker

Others
 Piatti scooter, a motor scooter of the 1950s
 In older music scores, piatti is the Italian term for cymbals

See also
 Pattie (disambiguation)
 Patty (disambiguation)
 Patti (name)